Aston Brad Fortuin (born ) is a South African rugby union player for the Utah Warriors of Major League Rugby (MLR) in the United States. His regular position is lock.

References

South African rugby union players
Living people
1996 births
Rugby union players from Cape Town
Cape Coloureds
Rugby union locks
Blue Bulls players
Southern Kings players
Sharks (Currie Cup) players
Utah Warriors players
RC Narbonne players